Jean Pierre Pellissier (28 September 1808 in St. Arey, France – 11 June 1867 in Bethulie, Orange Free State, South Africa) was a missionary from the Paris Evangelical Missionary Society to Southern Africa.

To South Africa 

He arrived in Cape Town, South Africa on 5 September 1831, where he stayed at Wamakersvallei (Wellington, South Africa) for two months, to learn Dutch.

Movements in South Africa 

He departed from Wamakersvallei to Kuruman, South Africa to do mission work among the Tswana people (Zeerust).
Local infighting between rival tribes caused him to move to the area north of the Orange River in 1833, to a site where the London Missionary Society had an unsuccessful attempt to start a mission station among the Khoi people.
He later named the mission station Bethulie (meaning Eloah – house of God). The land of the mission station was transferred to the Paris Mission Society in 1836. 
Besides his mission work, Pellissier made a great contribution towards practical education and medicine among the local people.
This resulted in one of the best-developed mission stations in southern Africa beyond the Orange River for that period.

Family life 

He married Martha Thorpe Murray (b.23 February 1814, d.17 October 1887) a 1820 Settlers child.
He had six daughters and 1 son: Henriette (b.1835), Amelie (b.1838), Louise (b. 1841), Marie (b.1843), Charlotte (b.1846), Emilie (b.1848), Samuel Henri (b.1850).

Acknowledgement 

In 1861 he was officially acknowledged as a medical practitioner by the local government of the Orange Free State.

Sources
Elsevier, Amsterdam. (1976) Ensiklopedie van die Wereld part 8; C.F. Albertyn (Edms) Bpk, Stellenbosch. 
Pellissier, S.H. (1956) Jean Pierre Pellissier van Bethulie; J.L. van Schaik, Bpk, Pretoria.

References

1808 births
1867 deaths
French Protestant missionaries
Protestant missionaries in South Africa
French evangelicals